|}

The Prix de Lieurey is a Group 3 flat horse race in France open to three-year-old thoroughbred fillies. It is run at Deauville over a distance of 1,600 metres (about 1 mile), and it is scheduled to take place each year in August.

History
The event is named after Lieurey, a commune located in the Eure department in the Upper Normandy region of France. It was established in 1972, and it was initially contested over 2,400 metres. It was cut to 1,600 metres in 1977, and given Listed status in 1987.

The Prix de Lieurey was sponsored by Haras des Capucines in 2004, and by Shadwell from 2005 to 2010. It was promoted to Group 3 level in 2009.

Records
Leading jockey since 1978 (5 wins):
 Thierry Jarnet – Lost Prairie (1993), Desert Kaya (1994), Vadlamixa (1995), Soeur Ti (1998), Zietory (2003)
 Olivier Peslier – Irish Source (1992), Kool Kat Katie (1997), Gwenseb (2006), Bawina (2014), Trixia (2016)

Leading trainer since 1979 (7 wins):
 André Fabre – J'ai Deux Amours (1989), Lost Prairie (1993), Desert Kaya (1994), Vadlamixa (1995), Lady Frankel (2017), Wind Chimes (2018), Fount (2019)

Leading owner since 1979 (3 wins):
 Ecurie Aland – Sentimentalite (1986), Liska's Dance (1987), Most Precious (1988)
 Jean-Luc Lagardère – Pinaflore (1990), Desert Kaya (1994), Vadlamixa (1995)

Winners since 1978

See also
 List of French flat horse races

References

 France Galop / Racing Post:

 france-galop.com – A Brief History: Prix de Lieurey.
 horseracingintfed.com – International Federation of Horseracing Authorities – Prix de Lieurey (2017).
 galopp-sieger.de – Prix de Lieurey.
 pedigreequery.com – Prix de Lieurey – Deauville.

Flat horse races for three-year-old fillies
Deauville-La Touques Racecourse
Horse races in France
Recurring sporting events established in 1972